Bhaskaran Pillai Sudheendra Kumar (born 31 May 1959) is the judge of Kerala High Court. The High Court of Kerala is the highest court in the Indian state of Kerala and in the Union Territory of Lakshadweep. The High Court of Kerala is headquartered at Ernakulam, Kochi.

Education and career
Kumar obtained a law degree from Government Law College, Ernakulam and completed post graduation in Law from Mahatma Gandhi University, Kerala.  Kumar enrolled as an Advocate in 1989. He joined Kerala Judicial Service 2001 as District and Sessions Judge and served as Additional District Judge-II, Thiruvananthapuram, Enquiry Commissioner and Special Judge (Vigilance), Calicut, Registrar, Supreme Court of India, New Delhi, Additional District and Sessions Judge, Kasaragod and Calicut, Registrar, Railway Claims Tribunal, New Delhi and as District & Sessions Judge, Thiruvananthapuram and Thrissur. On 10 April 2015 he was appointed as additional judge of Kerala High Court and became permanent from 5 April 2017

References

External links
 High Court of Kerala

Living people
Judges of the Kerala High Court
1959 births
Indian judges